2007 McCuskey, provisional designation , is a carbonaceous asteroid from the inner regions of the asteroid belt, approximately 22 kilometers in diameter. It was discovered on 22 September 1963, by astronomers of the Indiana Asteroid Program at Goethe Link Observatory near Brooklyn, Indiana, United States. The asteroid was later named after American astronomer Sidney McCuskey.

Orbit and classification 

McCuskey is a dark asteroid that orbits the Sun in the inner main-belt at a distance of 2.1–2.7 AU once every 3 years and 8 months (1,344 days). Its orbit has an eccentricity of 0.12 and an inclination of 3° with respect to the ecliptic.

Physical characteristics 

McCuskey has been described as a dark C-type asteroid, compatible with the measured color index and opposition/slope parameter.

Diameter and albedo 

According to the more recent 2015/16 results of the NEOWISE survey carried out by NASA's Wide-field Infrared Survey Explorer, McCuskey measures 19.08 and 20.21 kilometers in diameter and its surface has an albedo of 0.06 and 0.05, respectively.

The Collaborative Asteroid Lightcurve Link derives an albedo of 0.0558 and a diameter of 21.78 kilometers based on an absolute magnitude of 12.06.

Lightcurves 

In March 2013, a rotational lightcurve of McCuskey was obtained from photometric observations by an international collaboration of astronomers. Lightcurve analysis gave a well-defined rotation period of 8.603 hours with a brightness variation of 0.18 magnitude.

Astronomers at Texas A&M University using the 0.6-meter SARA South Telescope at Cerro Tololo in August 2014, determined a concurring period of 8.611 hours with a brightness amplitude of 0.21 magnitude.

Naming 

This minor planet was named in honour of American mathematician and astronomer Sidney Wilcox McCuskey (1907–1979), who was the director of the Warner and Swasey Observatory and president of IAU Commission 33, Structure and Dynamics of the Galactic System. He is best known for his contribution on stellar luminosity and galactic structure. The approved naming citation was published by the Minor Planet Center on 6 June 1982.

References

External links 
 Asteroid Lightcurve Database (LCDB), query form (info )
 Dictionary of Minor Planet Names, Google books
 Asteroids and comets rotation curves, CdR – Observatoire de Genève, Raoul Behrend
 Discovery Circumstances: Numbered Minor Planets (1)-(5000) – Minor Planet Center
 
 

002007
002007
Named minor planets
19630922